Jessy Franco (born 7 December 1998) is a Gibraltarian sprinter. He represented his territory in the 400 metres at the 2019 World Championships in Doha without advancing from the first round but setting a new national record of 47.41.

He has a Gibraltarian father and Faroese mother who met when competing at the 1989 Island Games in athletics and gymnastics respectively. Jessy himself later competed at two editions of the Games. His older brother Julian was also a sprinter.

International competitions

Personal bests
Outdoor
100 metres – 10.90 (+0.4 m/s, Gibraltar 2018) NR
200 metres – 21.20 (+0.9 m/s, Pretoria 2016)
400 metres – 47.41 (Doha 2019) NR
Indoor
200 metres – 22.34 (Antequera 2018)

References

1998 births
Living people
Gibraltarian male sprinters
World Athletics Championships athletes for Gibraltar
Athletes (track and field) at the 2018 Commonwealth Games
Gibraltarian people of Faroese descent
Commonwealth Games competitors for Gibraltar